Bridget Jones's Baby is a 2016 romantic comedy film directed by Sharon Maguire and written by Helen Fielding, Dan Mazer and Emma Thompson, based on the fictional columns by Fielding. It is the third film in the franchise and a sequel to the 2004 film Bridget Jones: The Edge of Reason. The film once again stars Renée Zellweger as the lovable singleton Bridget Jones, who is shocked when she finds out she is pregnant. However, it's a bumpy road to the birth as Bridget must deduce which of her two recent loves is the father, reserved lawyer Mark Darcy (Colin Firth, also reprising his role) or charming mathematician Jack Qwant (Patrick Dempsey), all while trying to hide one from the other. The film marked Zellweger's return to the screen after a six-year hiatus.

Filming began on 2 October 2015 in London. The film was released theatrically on 16 September 2016 in the United Kingdom and United States and on 5 October in France. A critical and commercial success, the film received generally positive reviews and grossed over $211 million worldwide on a budget of $35 million. A sequel is in development.

Plot
On her forty-third birthday, Bridget Jones attends the memorial of her ex, Daniel Cleaver, presumed dead after a plane crash. She sees her other ex, Mark Darcy, with his wife Camilla.

Bridget now works as a television producer and is close friends with coworker Miranda. After spending the night of her birthday alone, Bridget decides to embrace single life, accepting Miranda's offer to go to a music festival where she meets Jack, a handsome man, after she falls into some mud. Later that evening a drunk Bridget crawls into his yurt, thinking it's hers and Miranda's. He invites her to stay and they have a one-night stand. In the morning, waking alone, Bridget leaves, unaware Jack is out getting breakfast for them both.

Returning home, Bridget goes to her friend Jude's new baby's christening, where she is the godmother and Mark has been asked to be the godfather at the last minute. He tells her he and his wife are divorcing and Camilla was only at the funeral for moral support. Realising they are still in love, Bridget and Mark spend the night together. Mark is travelling for work early the next day, so Bridget exits before he wakes up, leaving a note telling him that she fears reconnecting will repeat their past mistakes.

Weeks later, Bridget discovers she is pregnant. She decides she wants to keep the baby despite being single. After a visit to the clinic of Dr. Rawlings, she realises the father could be Mark or Jack. She is unable to contact Jack until Miranda spots him in a TV ad and discovers he is Jack Qwant, a billionaire mathematician, creator of a dating website.

Miranda and Bridget conspire to have Jack as a guest on their news show to get DNA samples to work out if Jack is the father. Although Bridget tries to stay incognito, he recognises her and asks her why she left after their night together. She apologises, blurting out that she is pregnant, implying he is the father, without mentioning Mark. Initially taken aback, Jack later throws himself into the role of father. Bridget also tells Mark the news; he is so thrilled at the prospect that she cannot bear to tell him about Jack. Dr. Rawlings tries to administer an amniocentesis DNA test, but Bridget decides not to go ahead with it while her child is still in the womb as she fears the risk of miscarriage.

Bridget invites Jack to a work event, and is startled when Mark shows up as well. They meet, and the three go out to dinner, where Bridget finally admits that she is unsure who the father is. Although disappointed, Jack takes the news well, but Mark is upset and walks out, though he eventually becomes supportive as well. Mark and Jack eventually become jealous of each other’s bond with Bridget and try to one up each other.

They pretend to be in a gay relationship to avoid embarrassment when the trio attend prenatal classes, which irritates Mark. He becomes increasingly more envious of Bridget and Jack's close relationship and is devastated when Jack lets Mark believe he and Bridget had sex without condoms, making it more likely for Jack to be the father. Mark leaves, ignoring Bridget's calls. Jack asks her to move in with him, but he eventually confesses to Bridget what he told Mark. Upset, Bridget rushes to tell Mark, but seeing his wife arriving at his house, she walks away.

Nine months into her pregnancy, Bridget finds herself locked out in the rain. Mark arrives and breaks into the flat for her. He tells her his wife was at the flat to pick up the last of her things. Just as they are about to kiss, her water breaks. When his mobile rings, Mark romantically throws it out the window, leaving them without a means to call help. They eventually make it to the hospital with some help from Gianni and Jack. Later Jack apologises to Mark for his behaviour. Bridget gives birth to a healthy baby boy, and her friends and parents come to visit them. Dr. Rawlings takes Mark and Jack away to perform the DNA test, and they genuinely wish each other luck.

A year later, Bridget marries Mark, and it is revealed he is the baby's father. Jack is a guest, showing no sign of resentment or jealousy, happily playing with Bridget and Mark's son William. Bridget expresses her contentment that everything worked out. The film ends with a newspaper headline revealing Daniel Cleaver has been found alive.

Cast

Production
In July 2009, Variety announced that a third Bridget Jones film was in the early stages of development. Working Title Films confirmed that it would not be based on Helen Fielding's third Bridget Jones novel, but instead would be based on the columns she wrote for The Independent in 2005.

On 1 March 2011, it was reported that both Renée Zellweger and Colin Firth were interested in reprising their roles. In July 2011, Paul Feig was in final talks to direct the film based on the script by author Fielding. On 11 August 2011, Universal Studios and Working Title greenlit the third film. On 4 October 2011, Deadline reported that Feig had exited the project due to creative differences with Working Title, and Feig had also worked on the recent draft of the script. Production was slated to begin in January 2012 with the returning cast including Zellweger, Firth, and Hugh Grant. On 30 November 2011, Peter Cattaneo came on board to direct the sequel, newly titled "Bridget Jones's Baby" from a script by Fielding, Feig, and David Nicholls. Producers on board were Tim Bevan and Eric Fellner of Working Title, along with Jonathan Cavendish of Little Bird. The production was delayed due to creative differences between the script of the film and actors, especially Grant as he reportedly disliked the script and left the project, though this was denied by producer Bevan. However, the producer confirmed that they were working on the script and the film would be made as planned.

In April 2013, Firth spoke to the Chicago Sun-Times, stating "unfortunately, it might be a bit of a long wait", and he said he "wouldn't say that it's completely dead in the water, but the way it's going, you might be seeing Bridget Jones's granddaughter's story being told by the time we get there."

In an interview on 10 October 2014, Grant mentioned an existing script for a sequel, though he also expressed his dislike for it, and stated that he would not star in the third film. Later in the next week, producers hired Emma Thompson to rewrite the original script written by Fielding and Nicholls.

Gemma Jones and Jim Broadbent were in talks to return for the third film to join the cast. On 9 September 2015, Patrick Dempsey joined the cast of the film.

Filming
 
Filming for a short period began in July 2015 in Dublin, where the first scenes for the film were shot at Ed Sheeran's concert at Croke Park. Official principal photography with the actual cast began on 2 October 2015 in London.

The Television Studio interior scenes, the Hospital Ward interiors and various other scenes were shot on Stages 5 and 6 at West London Film Studios.

On 13 October 2015, shooting was taking place at Borough Market, and later in October in Windsor Great Park, at Rosy Bottom.

Filming wrapped up on 27 November 2015. Reshoots took place for one week starting 8 January 2016.

Music

Release

In October 2015, Bridget Jones's Baby was set for a 16 September 2016 release.
On 23 March the first trailer was released. Like the previous two films, the movie received an R rating in the United States.

Zellweger's physical appearance in the trailer for the film rekindled a debate about the possibility that Zellweger had plastic surgery, which began in 2014 when she re-emerged from a long hiatus. An editorial focused on the trailer for the film by Variety critic Owen Gleiberman titled "Renee Zellweger: If She No Longer Looks Like Herself, Has She Become a Different Actress?" prompted a response from Zellweger, who called the scrutiny over her appearance "sexist" and attributing her difference in appearance solely to "ageing," and wrote an open essay explaining her response in the weeks before the film's release.

Box office
Bridget Jones's Baby grossed $212 million worldwide, including $24.1 million in the United States and Canada and $60 million in the United Kingdom, against a budget of $35 million.

The film was released in North America on 16 September 2016 and was projected to gross $12–16 million in its opening weekend from 2,927 theaters. It made $364,000 from its Thursday night previews and $3 million on its first day. In total, the film made $8.2 million in its opening weekend, falling below projections and scoring the lowest opening of the series.

Internationally, where Universal Pictures handled most of the releases, the film fared better and especially in the UK where the previous two installments registered the biggest grossers. It debuted day-and-date in conjuncture with its North American release in 41 countries, including big markets like the UK and Ireland, Russia, Australia, Mexico and Spain in its opening weekend. The film will be released in a total of 62 countries. It scored the biggest opening day in the franchise in the UK, the Netherlands and Latin America including Mexico, Panama and Peru, and had number-one opening days in the UK, Australia, Spain, Denmark, Finland, Hungary, Norway, Poland, Sweden, Croatia, Czech Republic, Slovakia, Slovenia, South Africa and Ukraine. Through Sunday, 18 September, it had an opening weekend of $29.9 million from 39 markets and debuted at number one in 24 of them. It was in second place at the box office, behind A Chinese Odyssey Part Three. It topped the international box office in its second weekend, earning $21.9 million from 47 markets. It recorded the biggest debut in the franchise and had number-one openings in certain markets like Australia ($4.2 million), the Netherlands ($1.9 million), Spain ($1.7 million), Iceland and New Zealand and bowed at second place in France ($3.7 million) and Russia ($1.4 million).

In the United Kingdom and Ireland – the biggest market for the first two films – the film opened on Friday, 16 September, and recorded the biggest comedy/romantic comedy opening day ever, as well as the biggest Working Title and September opening of all time with $4 million at 641 theaters. It went on to score a record breaking £8.11 million ($10.5 million) opening and dominated 57% of the total market share which is the biggest romantic comedy opening weekend ever in the UK; the biggest opening weekend ever for Working Title; and the biggest September launch weekend of all time. Excluding previews, the film has the seventh biggest debut of the year. The film fell just 20% in its second weekend to £6.4 million ($8.3 million) and continued to lead the box office for the third consecutive weekend, despite the influx of a row of competitions. After three straight wins, it was surpassed by The Girl on the Train in its fourth weekend. It broke a number of records including the fastest romantic comedy to earn £30 million, doing so on its seventeenth day (the first film took 31 days and the second film took 24 days). It has so far grossed a total of $54 million there becoming the biggest market outside of North America like its predecessors. Adjusted for inflation it is the lowest-grossing film behind both the films (£73.1 million and £57.8 million respectively).

After 31 days of playing in theaters, the film became the biggest film in the franchise in the United Kingdom with £42.24 million, surpassing the first film's final gross of £42 million. It currently sits as the third biggest film of 2016 behind Finding Dory (£42.25 million) and The Jungle Book (£46.1 million). In Netherlands, it is the highest-grossing Working Title picture of all time with $8.1 million — passing Notting Hill (1999), which held the record for 17 years.

Reception
Bridget Jones's Baby received generally positive reviews from critics. On Rotten Tomatoes, the film has an approval rating of 78%, based on 209 reviews, with an average rating of 6.33/10. The site's critical consensus reads, "Bridget Jones's Baby might be late on arrival, but fans of the series should still find its third installment a bouncing bundle of joy." On Metacritic, which assigns a normalized rating to reviews, the film has a score 59 out of 100, based on 42 critics, indicating "mixed or average reviews". Audiences polled by CinemaScore gave the film an average grade of "B+" on an A+ to F scale.

Accolades

Sequel
In October 2022, Fielding told the Radio Times that a sequel was in the works and  would loosely adapt her 2013 novel Mad About the Boy.

References

External links
 
 
 
 Official screenplay

Bridget Jones
2016 romantic comedy films
2016 films
2010s pregnancy films
American romantic comedy films
American sequel films
British romantic comedy films
British sequel films
Films directed by Sharon Maguire
Films produced by Eric Fellner
Films produced by Tim Bevan
Films set in London
Films shot in Berkshire
Films shot in Buckinghamshire
Films shot in London
Films shot in the Republic of Ireland
English-language French films
French romantic comedy films
French sequel films
Miramax films
Perfect World Pictures films
American pregnancy films
British pregnancy films
Films with screenplays by Dan Mazer
Films with screenplays by Emma Thompson
Films scored by Craig Armstrong (composer)
StudioCanal films
Universal Pictures films
Working Title Films films
Films shot at Pinewood Studios
2010s English-language films
2010s American films
2010s British films
2010s French films